James Oatway (born 1978) is a South African photojournalist. He was the Chief Photographer of the Sunday Times (South Africa) until 2016. His work focuses mainly on political and social issues in Africa, migration and people affected by conflict.

Education
Oatway graduated from Rhodes University in Grahamstown, South Africa with a Bachelor of Journalism degree.

Work
James Oatway is best known for photographs he took in 2015 of the killing of Emmanuel Sithole during Xenophobia in South Africa. Oatway’s work has been published in the Sunday Times, The Guardian, The New York Times, Time, Science magazine  Harper's Magazine  and various other publications around the world. He has covered conflict in the Democratic Republic of Congo  and the Central African Republic; War in Afghanistan; The earthquake in Haiti in 2010. Oatway is a member of the picture agency Panos.

Emmanuel Sithole images
On April 18, 2015 Oatway was on assignment for the Sunday Times covering Xenophobic violence in Alexandra Township in Johannesburg when he photographed a group of South African men beating and stabbing Emmanuel Sithole, a Mozambican trader. Oatway and his colleague, reporter Beauregard Tromp, took Sithole to a nearby clinic but were told that no doctors were on duty. They then took Sithole to Edenvale Hospital where he died shortly after arrival.

The photographs were published on the front page of the Sunday Times the following day and caused outrage across the region.

The South African National Defence Force (SANDF) was deployed to Alexandra the next day in an attempt to quell the violence.

South African President Jacob Zuma said that the pictures were “Unpatriotic” and “make South Africa look bad.” 

Four men were arrested and three men were convicted of Sithole’s murder. Mthintha Bhengu was sentenced to 17 years in prison; Sifundo Mzimela was sentenced to 10 years in prison and another youth was released with a suspended sentence.

In handing down the sentence, Magistrate Lucas Van der Schyff said: "This specific murder trial caught the entire country's attention because it was caught on camera. We were forced to witness this gruesome attack. By looking at the photos we were forced to share his pain, as he laid in the mud begging for mercy,"

Controversy
James Oatway was heavily criticized for not having intervened to save Emmanuel Sithole’s life. Oatway told TIME “I don’t have any regrets about taking the pictures,” adding: "I think my presence there distracted them and did discourage them." In response to criticism that the pictures were published he said:"It’s not easy to look at and I understand that some people might be offended by that, but really people have to know what’s happening, and people have to see the brutality and the vulgarity of what’s going on, so I’ve got no regrets that it’s on the front page,". Oatway wrote an article about his experience of the incident which was published in the Sunday Times. According to Oatway his only regret was that he wasn't able to get Sithole to a hospital in time to save his life.

Greg Marinovich, the Pulitzer prize winning photographer and author of The Bang-Bang Club defended Oatway’s actions. He wrote: "Would Oatway sleep better had he been able to save Sithole? Surely the answer is yes, but the photographer's duty was to capture those searing images and hope that society will act."

In 2010 Oatway was in Haiti covering the aftermath of the devastating earthquake that struck the Caribbean country. He was one of a group of photographers who photographed the death of Fabienne Cherisma, a fifteen-year-old girl who was allegedly shot by police during the unrest that had taken hold of Port-au-Prince. Oatway’s images of the dead Cherisma featured in a portfolio that was awarded an “Award of Excellence” in the Pictures of the Year International Awards (POYi). Oatway and the other photographers were criticized for acting in an inhumane fashion and benefitting from the death of Cherisma.

Awards

2018: Visa d’or Région of Occitanie / Pyrénées-Méditerranée Feature award (Visa Pour l'Image, Perpignan, France)

2016: CNN Multichoice African Journalist of the Year Awards 2016 - Winner: Mohamed Amin Photojournalism Award.

2016: Standard Bank Sikuvile Journalism Awards - Winner: South African Story of the Year

2016: Standard Bank Sikuvile Journalism Awards - Winner: News Photography

2015: Vodacom Journalist of the Year - Overall National Winner (South Africa).

2015: Vodacom Journalist of the Year Awards - National Photography Winner.

2014: Standard Bank Sikuvile Journalism Awards: Finalist-News Photography.

2013: Pictures of the Year International (POYi) - 2nd Place: Newspaper Photographer of the Year.

2013: Pictures of the Year International (POYi) - 2nd Place: Newspaper News Picture Story.

2011: Pictures of the Year International (POYi) - Award of Excellence: Multimedia Project (Impact 2010).

2011: Vodacom Journalist of the Year Awards - Central Region Photography Winner.

2010: Prix Bayeux-Calvados (des correspondants de guerre) - Finalist.

2010: Sony Profoto Awards: News Image of the Year.

2009: Pictures of the Year International (POYi) - Award of Excellence: Newspaper News Picture Story.

2008: Abdul Shariff Award (in Memory of Photographers who lost their lives in the line of duty).

Honours

In 2018 James Oatway's work on the notorious "Red Ants" eviction force in South Africa was awarded the prestigious Visa d'or Feature Award at Visa pour l'Image international festival of photojournalism in Perpignan, France.

In 2015 he was on the panel of judges for the News Division of the Pictures of the Year International Awards held at the University of Missouri’s School of Journalism.

In 2013 he was selected as a Taco Kuiper grantee.

He placed second in the 71st Pictures of the Year International “Newspaper Photographer of the Year” Awards. In 2016 he was the recipient of the Mohamed Amin Photojournalism Award at the prestigious CNN Multichoice African Journalism Awards.

Exhibitions
2018: Les Fourmis Rouges/The Red Ants - Visa Pour l'Image, Perpignan, France.

2018: Killing the Other (with Alon Skuy), Johannesburg Holocaust and Genocide Centre, Johannesburg, South Africa.

2016: Enemies and Friends, National Arts Festival, Grahamstown, South Africa.

Notes
South African radio interview:  http://www.thedailyvox.co.za/photographer-james-oatway-defends-pictures-of-murdered-mozambican-emmanuel-sithole/

Interview on CNN: http://edition.cnn.com/2015/04/20/africa/south-africa-xenophobia-killing-photos/

Interview on BBC: https://www.bbc.com/news/world-africa-32377891

External links
 Official website

1978 births
Living people
South African photojournalists
War photographers